Jean López (born August 31, 1973 in Texas, U.S.) is an American Taekwondo athlete and coach.

Biography
Lopez is a 1991 graduate of Kempner High School.

He was a four-time member of the U.S. National Taekwondo Team.  In 1995 Lopez won a silver medal at the 1995 Taekwondo World Championships.

Lopez coached the U.S. Olympic Taekwondo team in the 2004, 2008, and 2012 Olympic Games.

On April 3, 2018, Lopez was found guilty by the United States Center for SafeSport of sexual misconduct involving a minor, and was banned from USA Taekwondo. SafeSport found that Lopez had assaulted Mandy Meloon, Heidi Gilbert, and a third woman. The ban was overturned by an arbitrator in January 2019.

References

External links
 

Living people
Kempner High School alumni
1973 births
American male taekwondo practitioners